Wan Rohaimi bin Wan Ismail (born 19 May 1976) is a Malaysian former footballer and professional football coach.

Football career
Known as a multi-position player as he played for defender, central midfielder and striker. Started his career as a professional football player in 1996 represented Kelantan FA President's Cup squad. Promoted in the senior team after winning the President's Cup title in that year. Then transferred to Pahang FA in 1999. Being one of the top scorers in the league and his first debut with Malaysia national football team friendly match with Arsenal in the same year. Have also represented several teams in Malaysian Football League (MFL) such as Kelantan FA, Johor FC, Terengganu FA, Selangor FA and Selangor Public Bank FC.

Represented Malaysia national football team in between 1999 to 2006, participated in national competitions including FIFA World Cup qualifier and Tiger Cup.

Coaching career
The career started by leading Tumpat FA in the middle of 2013 FAM League. He joined National Football Development Programme of Malaysia (NFDP) coaching staff in 2014 to 2018. Was also a former u-13 and u-15 Malaysia national team coach participating in national tours, including Iber Cup Estoril, Portugal and Costa Del Sol, Spain.

National u-16 coaching staff together with Lim Teong Kim participated AFC U-16 Championship in Kuala Lumpur 2017 before taking lead for Klang Valley Elite team in 2018. Introduced as Perlis FA Youth Cup (u-19) head coach in 2019 before the club been relegated from the Malaysian Football League due to financial problems. Continues the career with Penang FA as President’s Cup (u-21) head coach. However, President Cup tournament was banned after 4 match due to Pandemic COVID-19, where Penang FA finished in the third places sharing 10 points with the top 2 teams.

In March 2021, he appointed as the head coach for PDRM FC in the Malaysia Premier League after 5 matches played.Back to 2021 season, he brought the club to a safe place from relegation. Having 7 games unbeaten since he took over the team in early April 2021. On 4 September 2022, it was announced that PDRM FC had parted ways with Wan Rohaimi.

In 2023, it is said that this coach has been appointed to lead the Kuala Lumpur City F.C. u-23 for the Reserve League team that will be held under Malaysian Football League soon.

Coaching method
Has come out with modern football pattern. In 2019, WR Notebook has been introduced for the coaches to take note and make plans about football. Introduces the next book "WR Session Plan" which gives example on the football training plan together with description. Followed with "Coaching Process" as the third book on the step to be a coach. Followed then with "Teknik Asas Bolasepak" for the football players in understanding football basic things.

Books 
 WR Notebook (For coaches/players to make a note or designing the tactical)
 WR Session Plan (Team planning with 4 training components for training sessions)
 WR Coaching Process (Step to be a good coaches)
 WR Teknik Asas Bolasepak (Basic technic for football for beginners)

Managerial statistics

Honours

Youth career
 1996 - President Cup gold medal with Kelantan FA u-21

Senior career
 1999 - Premier League first title with Pahang FA
 2001 - Malaysia Cup winner with Terengganu FA
 2002 - Charity Shield silver medal with Pahang FA
 2003 - Charity Shield gold medal with Penang FA
 2006 - Charity Shield silver medal with Selangor FA
 2011 - Malaysia Super League gold medal, Charity Shield gold medal, Malaysia FA Cup silver medal with Kelantan FA

Coaching career
 2015 - Iber Cup Costa Del Sol, Spain gold medal with NFDP Malaysia u-13
 2016 - KPM League first place with Sekolah Sukan Bukit Jalil (SSBJ) u-14

International Experiences

Player
 AFC Cup: 2006 (Selangor FA), 2008/2010 (Johor Darul Ta'zim FC)
 Tiger Cup: 2004 (Malaysia national football team)
 World Cup qualifier: 2006 (Malaysia national football team)

Coach
 Iber Cup: Costa Del Sol, Spain (2015), Estoril, Portugal (2015) Malaysia national football team u-13
 ASEAN Tour: Thailand, Cambodia, Vietnam (2015) Malaysia national football team u-13
 AFC Regional Festival of Football: Brunei, (2016) Malaysia national football team u-14
 AFC Cup: Malaysia, (2017) Malaysia national football team u-16
 AFF Cup: Thailand, (2017) Malaysia national football team u-15
 CP-Meiji Cup: Thailand, (2016) Malaysia national football team u-14

References

External links

1976 births
Living people
Malaysian footballers
Kelantan FA players
Sri Pahang FC players
Penang F.C. players
Terengganu FC players
Selangor FA players
Johor Darul Ta'zim F.C. players
Malaysia international footballers
People from Kota Bharu
People from Kelantan
Association football defenders
Association football forwards